The 2023 St. Louis aldermanic elections will be held in two rounds, with nonpartisan blanket approval voting primaries on March 7 and general elections on April 4. All 14 members of the St. Louis Board of Aldermen and the President of the Board of Aldermen will be elected. These will be the first elections held after Proposition R (2012) came into effect, reducing the number of alderpersons from 28 to 14.

Incumbent President of the Board Megan Green, a progressive who was first elected in a 2022 special election after the resignation of Lewis Reed, is running unopposed for a first full term. Numerous incumbent alderpersons are running in the newly-drawn 14 wards; the competitive nature of several incumbent match-ups has led to the 2023 elections being nicknamed "Aldergeddon" by some media outlets.

Winning candidates in even-numbered wards will serve four-year terms, coterminous with the President of the Board's term. Winning candidates in odd-numbered wards will serve two-year terms until 2025, when elections for four-year terms will be held.

President of the Board of Aldermen

Declared
Megan Green, incumbent President of the Board of Aldermen (2022–present) and former 15th ward alderwoman (2014–22)

Declined
Sharon Tyus, incumbent 1st ward alderwoman (2013–present) and former 20th ward alderwoman (1991–2003)

Results

Board of Aldermen

Ward 1
Located on the southern extreme of the city limits, the 1st ward partially or entirely covers the neighborhoods of Patch, Boulevard Heights, Carondelet, and Bevo Mill. Since 2021, this area has been represented by 13th ward Alderwoman Anne Schweitzer, who defeated incumbent Beth Murphy.

Declared
Tony Kirchner, sheriff deputy
Matthew Kotraba, insurance agent and 13th ward Republican committeman
Anne Schweitzer, incumbent 13th ward alderwoman (2021–present)

Endorsements

Results

Ward 2
Located in the city's southwest corner, the 2nd ward partially or entirely covers the neighborhoods of Boulevard Heights, Princeton Heights, and St. Louis Hills. Three incumbents currently represent areas of the new ward: Carol Howard (14th), Tom Oldenburg (16th), and Bill Stephens (12th). Only Oldenburg filed to run in the new 2nd ward.

Declared
Katie Bellis, former member of the Capital Committee’s Citizen Advisory Committee from Princeton Heights
Phil Menendez, former St. Louis Metropolitan Police Department officer from St. Louis Hills (Republican)
Tom Oldenburg, incumbent 16th ward alderman (2017–present)

Declined
Carol Howard, incumbent 14th ward alderwoman (2010–present)
Bill Stephens, incumbent 12th ward alderman (2021–present)

Results

Ward 3
The 3rd ward is located in the southeast of the city, anchored in the Dutchtown neighborhood. Incumbent 25th ward alderman Shane Cohn is the only candidate in this ward.

Declared
Shane Cohn, incumbent 25th ward alderman (2009–present)

Endorsements

Results

Ward 4
The 4th ward is located on the city's western edge, south of Forest Park and extending through the Hi-Pointe, Ellendale, and Lindenwood Park neighborhoods, including the area known as Dogtown. Incumbent aldermen Bret Narayan (24th) and Joe Vaccaro (23rd) are both running in this ward.

Declared
Bret Narayan, incumbent 24th ward alderman (2019–present)
Casey Otto, freelance photographer from Clifton Heights, son of former state representative Bill Otto
Joe Vaccaro, incumbent 23rd ward alderman (2009–present)

Endorsements

Results

Ward 5
The 5th ward covers The Hill, Southwest Garden, and North Hampton neighborhoods. Incumbent 10th ward alderman and former interim Board President Joe Vollmer is running in this ward.

Declared
Helen Petty, owner of ChopShop salon in Forest Park Southeast
Joe Vollmer, incumbent 10th ward alderman, former interim President of the Board of Aldermen (2022), and owner of Milo’s Bocce Garden in The Hill

Results

Ward 6
The south-central 6th ward is anchored around Tower Grove Park, covering the Shaw, Tower Grove South, and Compton Heights neighborhoods. Annie Rice, who currently represents the 8th ward in Shaw, declined to run in this district. The 15th ward, centered on Tower Grove South, is Board President Megan Green's former seat and currently vacant.

Declared
Jennifer Florida, former St. Louis Recorder of Deeds (2014) and 15th ward alderwoman (2001–14)
Daniela Velazquez, public relations executive at FleishmanHillard

Withdrawn
Megan Green, incumbent President of the Board of Aldermen (2022–present) and former 15th ward alderwoman (2014–22) (endorsed Velazquez)

Declined
Annie Rice, incumbent 8th ward alderwoman (2018–present) (endorsed Velazquez)

Endorsements

Results

Ward 7
The 7th ward covers Tower Grove East, Benton Park West, and the Gate District neighborhoods. Incumbent 6th ward alderwoman Christine Ingrassia from Tower Grove East has declined to run for re-election.

Declared
Jon-Pierre Mitchom
Cedric L. Redmon, Jr., musician
Alisha Sonnier, member of the St. Louis Public School Board

Declined
Christine Ingrassia, former 6th ward alderwoman (2013–23) (endorsed Sonnier)

Endorsements

Results

Ward 8
The 8th ward covers parts of Downtown St. Louis, Soulard, and Benton Park. Incumbent 20th ward alderwoman Cara Spencer is running for re-election in this ward, while incumbent aldermen Dan Guenther (9th) and Jack Coatar (7th) declined to run.

Declared
Shedrick Kelley, 7th ward aldermanic candidate in 2021
Ken Ortmann, former 9th ward alderman (1999–2017) and 9th ward aldermanic candidate in 2021
Cara Spencer, incumbent 20th ward alderwoman (2015–present) and 2021 mayoral candidate

Declined
Jack Coatar, incumbent 7th ward alderman (2015–present)
Dan Guenther, incumbent 9th ward alderman (2017–present)

Results

Ward 9
The 9th ward is located in the city's central corridor, east and southeast of Forest Park and covering the populous Central West End and Forest Park Southeast, the latter of which includes the Grove. Two incumbents are running in this ward: Tina "Sweet-T" Pihl (17th) and Michael J. Gras (28th).

In the initial unofficial results, incumbent alderpersons Tina Pihl and Mike Gras both received 868 votes, making it unclear who would advance to the general election against Michael Browning, who came in first. After absentee and provisional ballots were counted, Pihl surpassed Gras by 8 votes.

Declared
Michael Browning
Michael J. Gras, incumbent 28th ward alderman
Tina "Sweet-T" Pihl, incumbent 17th ward alderwoman

Results

Ward 10

The 10th ward is located on the city's western central edge, including Forest Park and the neighborhoods of Skinker-DeBaliviere and West End. Incumbent 26th ward alderwoman Shameem Clark Hubbard is running for re-election in this ward.

Declared
Shameem Clark Hubbard, incumbent 26th ward alderwoman (2019–present)
Emmett L. Coleman, businessman

Endorsements

Results

Ward 11
The 11th ward runs from central north city (including O'Fallon and JeffVanderLou) down to Midtown in the central corridor. Incumbent 21st ward alderwoman Laura Keys, who was elected in a 2022 special election after the resignation of John Collins-Muhammad, is running for re-election in this ward.

Declared
Laura Keys, incumbent 21st ward alderwoman (2022–present)
Carla "Coffee" Wright, perennial candidate and U.S. Senate candidate in 2018 and 2022

Withdrawn candidates
Marlene Davis, incumbent 19th ward alderwoman (2007–present)

Results

Ward 12
The 12th ward covers a broad area of north city, including the neighborhoods of Penrose and The Ville. There are five active candidates running in this ward, the most in this cycle. Incumbent alderwoman Sharon Tyus (1st) is running for re-election in this ward, despite previously speculating that she "might" challenge Megan Green for Board President.

Declared
Yolanda Brown
Darron Collins-Bey
Tashara Earl
Walter Rush
Sharon Tyus, incumbent 1st ward alderwoman (2013–present) and former 20th ward alderwoman (1991–2003)

Withdrawn candidate
Dwinderlin Evans, incumbent 4th ward alderwoman (2020–present)

Endorsements

Results

Ward 13
The 13th ward covers the northern extreme of the city limits, including the neighborhoods Baden, Riverfront, and North Riverfront. It is the largest of the 14 wards by area. Three incumbent are running for re-election in this ward: Pamela Boyd (27th), Lisa Middlebrook (2nd), and Norma Walker (22nd). It is the only election this cycle in which all candidates are incumbents.

Declared
Pamela Boyd, incumbent 27th ward alderwoman (2017–present)
Lisa Middlebrook, incumbent 2nd ward alderwoman (2017–present)
Norma Walker, incumbent 22nd ward alderwoman (2022–present)

Results

Ward 14
The 14th ward covers part of Downtown, Downtown West, St. Louis Place, and Hyde Park. Incumbent aldermen Brandon Bosley (3rd) and James Page (5th) are running for re-election in this district, as is state representative Rasheen Aldridge.

Declared
Rasheen Aldridge, state representative from the 78th district (2020–present)
Brandon Bosley, incumbent 3rd ward alderman (2017–present)
James Page, incumbent 4th ward alderman (2021–present)
Ebony Washington, real estate agent

Endorsements

Results

References

2023 elections in the United States
Local elections in Missouri